Woman to Woman is a 1947 British drama film directed by Maclean Rogers and starring Douglass Montgomery, Joyce Howard and Adele Dixon. It is based on the 1921 play Woman to Woman by Michael Morton which had previously been made into films twice during the 1920s. A Canadian officer and a French dancer engage in a doomed romance.

It was shot at British National's Elstree Studios. The film's sets were designed by the art director Holmes Paul. It was given a German release in 1950.

Main cast

References

Bibliography
 Goble, Alan. The Complete Index to Literary Sources in Film. Walter de Gruyter, 1999.

External links

1947 films
1947 drama films
British black-and-white films
British drama films
Films directed by Maclean Rogers
Films shot at British National Studios
British films based on plays
Remakes of British films
1940s English-language films
1940s British films